Kobiela, less commonly Kobiella, is a Polish surname. Notable people with the surname include:

 Bogumił Kobiela (1931–1969), Polish actor
 Dorota Kobiela (born 1978), Polish filmmaker

See also
 

Polish-language surnames